Euros Lyn (born 1971) is a Welsh film and television director, best known for his work in Doctor Who, Sherlock, Black Mirror, Daredevil, His Dark Materials and Heartstopper.

Early life
Lyn was born in Cardiff. His family moved to north Wales and later back south to Swansea. He was educated at Ysgol Gyfun Ystalyfera and studied Drama at the University of Manchester.

Career

Lyn started his career directing Welsh-language programmes broadcast on S4C, such as Pam Fi Duw?, Iechyd Da and Y Glas.

He directed nine episodes of Doctor Who and won the BAFTA Cymru award for Best Director for "Silence in the Library" and the 2007 Hugo Award for Best Dramatic Presentation, Short Form for "The Girl in the Fireplace". He also directed David Tennant's last episodes of Doctor Who.

In 2007, he directed the pilot of George Gently, based on the Inspector Gently novels by Alan Hunter, for BBC One. He has also directed four episodes of the long-running BBC medical drama Casualty.

In 2008, he directed Children of Earth, the five-episode Torchwood mini-series (often called series 3 of the show).

Lyn won the BAFTA Cymru for Best Director three times, most recently for the first series of Sherlock with Benedict Cumberbatch and Martin Freeman, which also won RTS and BAFTA Best Drama awards. He also directed Fifteen Million Merits, an episode of the anthology series Black Mirror for Channel 4, which won an International Emmy for Best Drama Series. In 2013 he directed three episodes of Broadchurch with David Tennant and Olivia Colman, and a further three episodes of the second instalment of BAFTA-winning series Last Tango in Halifax, after directing three episodes of the first series.

The crime series Happy Valley, which Lyn directed, was shown on BBC One in 2014. In 2015 the show won the BAFTA award for Best Drama Series. He also directed episodes of Gracepoint (FOX USA), Cucumber (Channel 4) and Daredevil (Netflix USA).

In 2015 Lyn received the Siân Phillips Award at the BAFTA Cymru ceremony for his contributions to the industry. In the same year, he directed the three-part BBC series Capital based on John Lanchester's novel of the same name.

In 2016 Lyn directed his first feature film, the Welsh-language , which was released with English subtitles as The Library Suicides and was based on Fflur Dafydd's book Y Llyfrgell. The film starred Ryland Teifi, Catrin Stewart, Dyfan Dwyfor and Sharon Haf Morgan.

Personal life
Lyn is a Welsh speaker. Lyn now lives in Llangennith, Gower, with his husband Craig Hughes.

Credits

References

External links

Euros Lyn at the British Film Institute

1971 births
20th-century Welsh LGBT people
21st-century Welsh LGBT people
Alumni of the Victoria University of Manchester
Hugo Award winners
LGBT film directors
Welsh gay men
LGBT television directors
Living people
People educated at Ysgol Gyfun Ystalyfera
Welsh film directors
Welsh television directors
Date of birth missing (living people)